Californium(III) chloride is an inorganic compound with a chemical formula CfCl3. Like in californium oxide (Cf2O3) and other californium halides, including californium fluoride (CfF3) and iodide (CfI3), the californium atom has an oxidation state of +3.

Preparation
Californium(III) chloride can prepared by reacting californium(III) oxide with hydrogen chloride.

Cf2O3 + 6 HCl → 2 CfCl3 + 3 H2O

Properties

Chemical properties 
When heating californium(III) chloride until 500 °C, it can hydrolyse to produce californium oxychloride.

Physical properties 
Californium(III) chloride is soluble in water, giving Cf3+ and Cl− ions. This salt has an emerald-green color. Its crystal structure is hexagonal. It is strongly radioactive.

See also 

 Californium
 Californium compounds

References

Californium compounds